The Australian Capital Territory is one of Australia's territories, and has established several territorial symbols and emblems.

Official symbols

See also 
 List of symbols of states and territories of Australia
 Australian state colours

References

 ACT Flags and Emblems - ACT Govt. Chief Minister Department